KGNT (103.9 FM) is a classic hits formatted radio station licensed to Smithfield, Utah and owned by Frandsen Media Company, LLC. The station features programming from CBS News Radio and Westwood One.

History
The station started out with the call sign KVEZ on January 10, 1983, and officially launched the following February. On September 1, 1993, the station changed its call sign to KNUC, and on March 1, 1998, to KGNT. On July 20, 2001, the station briefly switched calls to KBET. On August 16, 2001, it was reverted to KGNT.

In 2011, KGNT was granted a U.S. Federal Communications Commission construction permit to increase ERP to 6,000 watts and decrease HAAT to -47 meters.

References

External links

GNT
Classic hits radio stations in the United States